"Stand Up" is the first single from American rock band Trapt's 2005 album Someone in Control. It received radio airplay on July 12, 2005, and receives regular play-time at the Air Canada Centre during the pre-game warm-up of the Toronto Maple Leafs hockey club.

The song "Stand Up" was created when the band kept getting emails, calls and when they kept hearing about people getting beaten up and "...just sort of taking it." 

"Stand Up" topped out at No. 17 on the Modern Rock Tracks chart and No. 3 on the Mainstream Rock Tracks chart.

External links

Trapt songs
2005 singles
2005 songs
Reprise Records singles